The following is a list of unproduced Quentin Tarantino projects in roughly chronological order. During his long career, American film director Quentin Tarantino has worked on a number of projects which never progressed beyond the pre-production stage under his direction. Some of these projects are officially cancelled and scrapped or fell in development hell.

1980s

Love Birds In Bondage
Tarantino co-wrote Love Birds In Bondage with Scott Magill or McGill. Tarantino would go on to co-produce and co-direct the film. Magill committed suicide in 1987, but not before destroying all footage that had been shot. The film concerned a young woman who suffered a traumatic brain injury after an accident leading her to act erratically. She is institutionalized in a mental hospital and her boyfriend figures out a way to get himself admitted. Tarantino also played the boyfriend.

My Best Friend's Birthday

Long before his first released feature Reservoir Dogs, Tarantino met with Craig Hamann and was introduced to his 30-40 page script, My Best Friend's Birthday. Tarantino helped expand the script up to 80 pages and agreed to direct the film. On a $5,000 budget and a 16 mm camera, the film was shot in the span of four years. It was often alleged that the completed run time came out to 70 minutes but due to a lab fire during editing, the film was nearly destroyed, and only 36 minutes remained. However, in the 2019 book My Best Friend's Birthday: The Making of a Quentin Tarantino Film, written by Andrew J. Rausch, it was revealed the fire story was fabricated, with Tarantino choosing not to dismiss it as he thought it sounded interesting. In actuality, some rolls of film were simply discarded by mistake, and Tarantino, unsatisfied with the final product, edited together the scenes he liked, leaving the project unfinished. The 36 minute edit was roughly edited together, and screened at several film festivals.

The Open Road 
Tarantino co-worker and collaborator Roger Avary wrote a 40-80 page script while working with Tarantino at Video Archives. Avary likened it to Martin Scorsese's After Hours. The story revolved around a button up business man who decides to leave his world for the open road. He ends up picking up a wild hitchhiker and they get into various adventures. However, Avary struggled to finish the story and some point Tarantino started to work on it and make changes. According to Tarantino the title of the screenplay was Pandemonium Reigns. According to Avary, Pandemonium Reigns was a separate script about a boxer who does not throw a fight, and the origins of Butch Coolidge.

At some point the script was named The Open Road and Tarantino ended up turning it into a 500 page screenplay with Avary. A significant change came when Tarantino changed the business man and hitchhiker into a comic book store worker and a call girl named Clarence and Alabama. Clarence begins to write a movie script while the two of them are on the road about a psychotic fantasy version of him and Alabama. The couple are serial killers named Mickey and Mallory. Eventually story and plot from Clarence's script start to bleed into his and Alabama's life, blurring the lines of fantasy and reality. 

In spite of being 500 pages, neither Tarantino or Avary could figure out how to end the story. They deconstructed the whole thing leading to the screenplays of True Romance and Natural Born Killers, as well as aspects of Killing Zoe and Pulp Fiction.

1990s

Luke Cage film
After the release of Reservoir Dogs, Tarantino contemplated developing a film based on Luke Cage. Being a huge fan of the character, Tarantino held a meeting with producer Ed Pressman, who owned the film rights to Luke Cage, and proposed a film based on the character and suggested casting Laurence Fishburne as Cage. Despite liking the idea, Tarantino shifted his interest for Pulp Fiction.

The Man from U.N.C.L.E.
Tarantino was briefly attached to a film adaptation of the 1960s TV series The Man from U.N.C.L.E.. He opted to do Jackie Brown instead. Eventually, a film adaptation of the show without Tarantino's involvement was released in 2015 to lukewarm critical and box-office results.

The Psychic remake
Sometime in the 1990s, Tarantino considered remaking Lucio Fulci's 1977 giallo Sette note in nero (Seven Notes in Black), released in America as The Psychic. He intended for Jackie Brown co-star Bridget Fonda to star in the film. By the year 2000, Tarantino gave an update on the proposed remake: "It's a project in the murky future. I don't even own the rights to that stuff. It's one of those things where it's like if somebody buys the rights to make it, I won't make it. They can totally fuck it up. If it's meant to happen, it’ll happen.” No further remarks on the project were made until Dardano Sacchetti, one of the original film's writers, revealed in an interview conducted for its 2019 Blu-ray release that he had been in contact with producers from Sony Pictures, who were interested in having Tarantino or other directors remake the film.

The Killer Inside Me
In the mid-1990s, after the success of Pulp Fiction, Tarantino was attached to direct an adaption of The Killer Inside Me. Uma Thurman was set to star as Amy Stanton. Juliette Lewis was considered for the part of Joyce Lakeland and Brad Pitt was attached to star as Lou Ford. This effort fell through after the September 11 attacks, because the film script was deemed too violent. The film was eventually directed by Michael Winterbottom in 2010, without the involvement of Tarantino.

Silver Surfer film
Fresh off of the success of Reservoir Dogs, Tarantino went to Constantin Films with a completed script for a proposed Silver Surfer film. Ultimately, Constantin Films passed on his script.

Green Lantern film
In the late 1990s, Tarantino was offered to direct a film adaptation of Green Lantern before there was even a script, but he declined the offer.

Iron Man film
In 1999, Tarantino was also linked to a live-action Iron Man film, as director and writer.

Tarantino's Natural Born Killers
Tarantino sold his Natural Born Killers script to producers Jane Hamsher and Don Murphy for $10,000 after his previous attempt to direct the film himself on a half a million dollar budget. Hamsher and Murphy sold his script to Warner Bros. The script caught the attention of director Oliver Stone, who drastically reworked the script with David Veloz and associate producer Richard Rutowski, while retaining Tarantino's dialogue. Due to the heavy rewrites from Stone, Veloz, and Rutowski, Writers Guild of America ruled out for Tarantino to receive story credit.

Some of the changes include that Tarantino's version does not include a prison riot (although a small one is mentioned, allowing for Mickey and Mallory's escape), a resolved ending, or a compliant Wayne Gale. Mickey and Mallory both grow up happily with no abuse. They get married legally in front of a judge and do not have sex with or flirt with anyone else. There is a spoof version of the film-within-the-film. Instead of including this in Stone's film, Stone used it for the actual Mickey and Mallory, making them much more transparent and satirical. In Tarantino's script Mickey and Mallory grow tired of robberies and turn to home invasions and the butchering of entire families.

In Tarantino's version Mickey and Mallory are supporting characters. The story is told through the perspective of Wayne Gale and his TV crew. It focuses more on their dialogue and jokes. Tarantino also did not have a scene of Mickey and Mallory meeting a Native American guide of having a vision quest. The thing that Don Murphy honed in the most on in Tarantino's script was the jailhouse interview between Gale and Mickey. It was inspired by the interview between Geraldo Rivera and Charles Manson and Murphy had a personal obsession with Manson.

Tarantino gave a negative response to the film. Despite wishing the best for Stone during the film's production, he responded to the film saying, "I hated that fucking movie. If you like my stuff, don't watch that movie."

Tarantino's True Romance
Tarantino's screenplay included some notable differences from Tony Scott's film True Romance. Most notably the ending. In Tarantino's version Clarence is shot and killed. Once Alabama escapes with the money she contemplates suicide before ultimately deciding not to. She does not have a child or go to Mexico. Tarantino's screenplay also included music cues that were not included in the film and it was told non-linearly. There were some character changes. For example, in Tarantino's screenplay Floyd is not a stoner. There were also some small dialogue and scene changes. Examples include the initial drug meet up being at a zoo, not roller coaster, Dick Ritchie ending up in a hotel room full of beautiful women, and Elliot quoting William Shakespeare. The fictional film Coming Home In a Body Bag is talked about in more detail but there is no mention of a sequel.

The Vega Brothers / Double V Vega
When developing Inglourious Basterds, Tarantino began to consider making The Vega Brothers. The film would have starred Michael Madsen as Vic Vega (Mr. Blonde) from Reservoir Dogs and John Travolta as Vincent Vega from Pulp Fiction. In 2007, due to the actors' ages and because of their characters' deaths in their respective films, Tarantino claimed that the film, retitled Double V Vega, was "kinda unlikely now."

2000s

Forty Lashes Less One 
In 2000, Tarantino was rumoured to be developing the Elmore Leonard novel, Forty Lashes Less One, into a film. By 2007, he had written 20 pages of the screenplay. In 2015, he revealed that he still owned the rights to adapt the book, and that he was considering adapting it into a television miniseries.

Kill Bill video game 
In 2002 it was announced that Vivendi Games (originally Black Label Games) had acquired the rights to develop a video game based on Kill Bill that was meant to coincide with the film's 2003 release, with Tarantino serving as creative consultant. The project was shelved in 2003, with some demo footage leaking online.

Kill Bill anime film 
During the production of Kill Bill, Tarantino envisioned making an anime film featuring the Bride when she was with the Deadly Viper Assassination Squad.  Tarantino revealed at the 2006 San Diego Comic-Con International that he intended to make the film following Grindhouse, though by 2021 Tarantino stated the project never came to fruition due to his fatigue after working on the original Kill Bill films.

Kill Bill animated film 
During the production of Kill Bill, Tarantino envisioned making an animated movie that would showcase the origin of Bill and his three Godfathers: Hatori Hanso, Pei Mei, and Esteban Vihaio. Tarantino revealed at the 2006 San Diego Comic-Con International that he intended to make the film following Grindhouse, though by 2021 Tarantino stated the project never came to fruition due to his fatigue after working on the original Kill Bill films.

Kill Bill: Volume 3 and Volume 4

During the production of Kill Bill: Volume 1 and 2, Tarantino originally believed that he would do a further two live action Kill Bill films, tentatively believing that they would be made once every ten years.

In April 2004, Tarantino told Entertainment Weekly that he was planning a sequel:

Details emerged around 2007 about two possible sequels, Kill Bill: Volume 3 and Volume 4. According to the article, "the third film involves the revenge of two killers whose arms and eye were hacked by Uma Thurman in the first stories." The article adds that the "fourth installment of the popular kung fu action films concerns a cycle of reprisals and daughters who avenge their mother's deaths".

At the 2009 Morelia International Film Festival, Tarantino stated that he intended to make a third Kill Bill film. The same month, he stated that Kill Bill 3 would be his ninth film, and would be released in 2014. He stated that he wanted 10 years to pass after the Bride's last conflict, to give her and her daughter a period of peace.

In December 2012, Tarantino stated: "I don't know if there's ever going to be a Kill Bill Vol. 3. We'll see, probably not though." In January 2016, it was reported that Tarantino has spoken with Thurman on a potential return for a sequel, but noted that Tarantino remains non-committal on actually making a sequel.

In July 2019, Tarantino stated: "Me and Uma have talked about it recently, frankly, to tell you the truth, I have thought about it a little further. We were talking about it literally last week. If any of my movies were going to spring from my other movies, it would be a third ‘Kill Bill.’” In December, Tarantino said he had spoken to Thurman about an "interesting" idea for a new film: "It would be at least three years from now. It is definitely in the cards", while Uma Thurman confirmed that "Tarantino wrote something"

In June 2021, Tarantino stated that the film would take place 20 years following the original films, when Beatrix Kiddo and her daughter B.B. are forced to go on the run after a period of peace. He found the idea of casting Thurman and her daughter Maya Hawke in the two roles exciting, after having previously worked with Hawke on Once Upon a Time in Hollywood. He also noted the possibility of Elle Driver, Sophie Fatale, and Gogo's twin sister Shiaki also appearing in the film. Later that month, Tarantino stated that the sequels had not yet come to fruition, due to his reluctance to take on more Kill Bill films following the fatigue he endured in the making of the first two volumes.

Kill Bill: The Whole Bloody Affair 
Kill Bill debuted in its full form at the 2003 Cannes Film Festival. This print of the film was later shown at Tarantino's New Beverly Cinema in 2011. This print included intermissions, and ran at 215 minutes. It differs in many ways from the theatrical cuts, with changes including the Klingon proverb included at the beginning of the film being replaced with a dedication to filmmaker Kinji Fukasaku, a fight sequence no longer being in black-and-white footage, additional violence and gore, and the removal of the cliffhanger reveal at the conclusion of Volume 1, revealing The Bride's daughter to be alive. Also removed are the first film's end credits, and the second film's opening recap sequence.

In July 2014, Tarantino stated that he and the Weinstein Company planned for The Whole Bloody Affair to have a limited theatrical release within the following year. This version of the film was set to include an extended anime sequence, which had been commissioned, financed, and produced by Production I.G based on the original script without Tarantino's request. As of March 2022, the film has yet to receive a limited theatrical run or home release.

Untitled kung-fu project
Following the success of his Kill Bill films, Tarantino began developing a kung-fu followup film that would be entirely in Mandarin. It was to be made before Inglourious Basterds. The inspiration to do another martial arts film came from Tarantino seeing Zhang Yimou's House of Flying Daggers at the 2004 Cannes Film Festival. It wasn't known if Tarantino would hire actors fluent in Mandarin or celebrities that would have to learn Mandarin. The plan on releasing was to have two theatrical cuts, one with subtitles and the other with an out-of-sync English language dubbing, similar to old-school re dubs. Since then, no updates have emerged from the ambitious project.

Casino Royale
In the mid-2000s, Tarantino expressed interest in directing Casino Royale, the 2006 film adaptation of Ian Fleming's debut novel and the debut of James Bond. Unfortunately, Eon Productions had no interest in hiring Tarantino. He claims to have worked behind the scenes with the Fleming family, and believed this was the reason why filmmakers finally went ahead with Casino Royale. Tarantino also said he would have set it in the 1960s and would have only made it with Pierce Brosnan returning as Bond. By February 2005, Martin Campbell was announced as the film's director, and the film was released on November 14, 2006, to critical and box-office success.

Untitled disaster project / Airport 2005
Tarantino wanted to take his hand at another popular '70s genre film, where Jackie Brown was with blaxploitation and Kill Bill was with kung-fu films, this time with a disaster film. Taking inspiration from films like The Towering Inferno, The Poseidon Adventure, and Airport, Tarantino wanted to get as many of his reoccurring actors as possible and jokingly dubbed this Airport 2005. He remarked his casting choice as so: "Travolta could be the pilot, Pam Grier the stewardess, Robert Forster, Michael Madsen, Tim Roth, Harvey Keitel, Bridget Fonda.” But, no other updates have emerged since then, and Forster died on October 11, 2019.

Grindhouse 2
Both Tarantino and Robert Rodriguez have expressed interest in making a sequel to their 2007 double-feature film Grindhouse. Tarantino said that he wants to shoot an "old-school Kung Fu movie in Mandarin with subtitles in some countries, and release a shorter, dubbed cut in others" for his segment. It has also been reported by Rotten Tomatoes that Edgar Wright may expand Don't into a feature film. According to Eli Roth, he and Wright have discussed the possibility of pairing Don't with Thanksgiving for a Grindhouse sequel. Roth is quoted as saying "We're talking to Dimension about it. I think they're still trying to figure out Grindhouse 1 before we think about Grindhouse 2, but I've already been working on the outline for it and I would do it in a heartbeat."

Westworld remake
In 2007, after the modest success of Death Proof, Warner Bros. had hired Tarantino to direct an remake of the 1973 science-fiction film Westworld. Arnold Schwarzenegger was involved in the project as the lone gunslinger. However, Tarantino was fired due to creative differences with Warner Bros., specifically on the fact he wanted it to have a dark tone and was unsatisfied with Schwarzenegger. Eventually, the project was scrapped.

Sgt. Rock film adaption 
Following the release of Death Proof, Warner Bros. also offered Tarantino a film adaption of the DC Comics character Sgt. Rock, with a script written by David Peoples. In June 2021, Tarantino called the script magnificent, and believed he "would do a good job" if he directed it. He also noted that he doubted he would make the film, but still considered it "from time to time".

Faster, Pussycat! Kill! Kill! remake
Tarantino expressed in January 2008 his interest in a raunchy remake of the 1966 sexploitation film Faster, Pussycat! Kill! Kill!. The film has quite an influence on Tarantino; even going as far as to referencing the movie and giving co-writer/director of Faster, Pussycat!, Russ Meyer, thanks in his 2007 film Death Proof. His top casting choices would have been Kim Kardashian, Eva Mendes, and Britney Spears. By July of that same year, Tarantino was considering casting porn star Tera Patrick as Varla. When the rumor of Britney Spears playing Varla was brought to his attention, a source close to Tarantino replied that, "There is no truth to this." Actress Tura Satana clarified in an interview that she is working closely with Tarantino in rewriting the script. Since then, no other updates have emerged from his remake.

Len Deighton adaptations
When promoting the Kill Bill films, he stated that he was a huge fan of Simon Pegg, and sought to adapt the Len Deighton novels into a film starring Pegg, Kate Winslet, Michael Caine, and Anthony Hopkins.

Biopics
On the biopic genre, Tarantino has said that he has "no respect" for biopics, saying that they "are just big excuses for actors to win Oscars. ... Even the most interesting person – if you are telling their life from beginning to end, it's going to be a fucking boring movie." However, in a 2009 interview with Charlie Rose, he said, "There is one story that I could be interested in, but it would probably be one of the last movies I [ever make] ... My favorite hero in American history is John Brown. He's my favorite American who ever lived. He basically single-handedly started the road to end slavery and ... he killed people to do it. He decided, 'If we start spilling white blood, then they're going to start getting the idea.'"

Untitled 1930s gangster project
Tarantino first teased at the Morelia International Film Festival in Mexico back in 2009 about possibly doing a crime film in the style of a 1930s Warner Bros-type gangster film; nothing came from this since then.

Hostel: Part III
In the 2000s, Tarantino acted as an executive producer for Eli Roth's films Hostel and Hostel: Part II. In July 2009, Roth confirmed that he would not be directing Hostel: Part III and Tarantino also did not return as an executive producer.

Untitled Howard Hawks-style project
Tarantino had expressed interest in making a screwball romantic comedy film in the vein of Howard Hawks films that would've starred two A-list leads. No other news updates have emerged since.

2010s

Untitled medieval project 
In January 2010, Tarantino announced that his next film, after Inglourious Basterds, will be a medieval film. He offered a role to Helen Mirren as a foul-mouthed monarch. The film was to retain Tarantino's signature traits, bloody violence and foul language, and was to be set in England's Middle Ages. Mirren had previously played a queen in 2006's The Queen as Queen Elizabeth II and was willing to play a monarch yet again. Although she was interested in the role, no other updates have emerged from this project, and his follow-up film to Inglourious was Django Unchained.

Less than Zero remake

In May 2010, Bret Easton Ellis, author of the 1985 novel Less than Zero, confirmed in an interview that Tarantino had been "trying to get Fox to let him remake the 1987 film". In 2012, when asked whether Less than Zero would be remade, Ellis once again confirmed that Tarantino "has shown interest" in adapting the story.

From Dusk till Dawn 4
In December 2010, the production of a fourth From Dusk till Dawn film was in the planning stages, but further work on this possibility has not been revealed. In November 2013, it was reported that From Dusk till Dawn: The Series had begun production, without any further mention of the film.

Untitled family film
In 2011, Tarantino briefly mentioned that he would like to do a children's film. He recalls in an interview on the Reelz Channel:

Killer Crow
In a late 2012 interview with the online magazine The Root, Tarantino described his next film as being the final entry in a "Django-Inglourious Basterds" trilogy called Killer Crow. The film will depict a group of World War II-era black troops who have "been fucked over by the American military and kind of go apeshit. They basically – the way Lt. Aldo Raine (Brad Pitt) and the Basterds are having an 'Apache resistance' – [the] black troops go on an Apache warpath and kill a bunch of white soldiers and white officers on a military base and are just making a warpath to Switzerland." Since then, no updates have emerged.

Django in White Hell 
In November 2013, Tarantino announced plans to direct another western film, following Django Unchained. The project began development as a sequel novel to Django Unchained, and then a sequel film, before Django was removed from the script and the project was rewritten as his 2015 film The Hateful Eight.

Untitled science fiction / horror film
At the San Diego Comic-Con in 2014, Tarantino revealed he is contemplating a possible science-fiction film that would also contain horror elements. Tarantino stated the film would "not be a spaceship movie" and would take place on Earth. He was inspired to create the project after watching It Follows, which he enjoyed, but said “It’s one of those movies that’s so good that you start getting mad at it for not being great. The fact that he didn’t take it all the way makes me not just disappointed but almost a little angry.” The project, which Tarantino stated was also inspired by The Thing, Halloween, Stalker and The Texas Chainsaw Massacre, was described as a "slasher sci-fi horror", but ultimately canceled the film, saying that his writing style "was too wordy for horror". However, in 2019, he said he would love to revive the project as his final film.

Django/Zorro
In 2015, a Django Unchained sequel crossover comic entitled Django/Zorro was released by Dynamite Entertainment. In June 2019, Tarantino had picked Jerrod Carmichael to co-write a film adaptation based on the crossover comic book series. In December 2019, it was reported that Tarantino was looking to make a smaller, stand-alone film, leaving development on Django/Zorro in doubt.

The Hateful Eight stage adaptation
In early 2016, Tarantino announced that he plans to write and direct a stage play version of The Hateful Eight, something that he still had an interest in pursuing by June 2021.

Star Trek
It was announced in December 2017 that Tarantino had pitched an idea to Paramount Pictures for a new Star Trek film. A writers room, consisting of Mark L. Smith, Lindsey Beer, Megan Amram and Drew Pearce, was assembled to flesh out the concept. The plan would be for Tarantino to direct the film, with J. J. Abrams, who had previously directed and produced earlier Star Trek reboot projects,  on board to produce. Smith later became the frontrunner to write the screenplay later that month.

In May 2019, Tarantino confirmed that his Trek film was still in development, saying "It's a very big possibility. I haven't been dealing with those guys for a while cause I've been making my movie. But we've talked about a story and a script. The script has been written and when I emerge my head like Punxsutawney Phil, post-Once Upon a Time in Hollywood, we'll pick up talking about it again." Tarantino discussed the project in June 2019, stating that Smith had turned in his script, and Tarantino would soon be adding in his notes. He asserted his intention for the film to be rated R.

In December 2019, it was reported that Tarantino had left the project, looking to make a smaller budget film. In January 2020, Tarantino stated the film "might" be made, but he would not direct it.

In August 2021, Smith stated that the film would have revolved around Captain Kirk and his crew, with the film taking inspiration from gangster films, and involving time travel. It would have also been standalone in nature, similar to an episode of Star Trek: The Original Series.

Bounty Law 
In July 2019, Tarantino revealed that he had written a limited series of five half-hour episodes of the in-universe Once Upon a Time in Hollywood television series Bounty Law, and that he intended to shoot the episodes in black and white and on film. Tarantino doubted that Leonardo DiCaprio, the actor who portrayed Rick Dalton the star of Bounty Law, would want to reprise the role, but would be pleased if he could. He had an outline for a further three episodes, and named Showtime, HBO, Netflix and FX as possible platforms for the series. Speaking about the project in July 2021, Tarantino stated that he had written "five or six" episodes of the show, and that it would be inspired by shows such as Wanted Dead Or Alive and The Rifleman. He believed it could be his next dramatic project following the stage adaptation of Once Upon a Time in Hollywood. Sony stated to Tarantino that they would make the series, should he decide to move forward with it, though he noted that was unlikely to happen for a "couple [of] years". In September 2021, it was announced that a script for a Bounty Law episode, titled "Incident at Inez" would be included in the hardcover release of the Once Upon a Time in Hollywood novelization.

Once Upon a Time in Hollywood extended cut 
In August 2019, it was reported that a four-hour extended cut of Once Upon a Time in Hollywood could arrive on Netflix, in a similar fashion to the extended cut of The Hateful Eight, something actor Brad Pitt confirmed in September 2019 as something Tarantino had discussed. In January 2020, Tarantino, stated that the extended cut would likely be available in approximately one year. In June 2021 Tarantino said the cut would probably be released "in a couple of years." It will be roughly three hours and 20 minutes and is currently intended for a theatrical release.

2020s

Reservoir Dogs remake 
In June 2021, Tarantino stated that he had considered a remake of his 1992 directorial debut Reservoir Dogs, as his tenth and final film, though he quickly iterated that he "won't do it". His idea would have featured the main cast being portrayed by black actors. Tarantino indicated that he would instead prefer to make a Reservoir Dogs stage adaption.

Reservoir Dogs stage adaptation 
In June 2021, Tarantino said that he wanted to make a stage adaptation of his 1992 film Reservoir Dogs.

Reservoir Dogs novelization 
In June 2021, Tarantino stated, "I could see myself writing a novelization of Reservoir Dogs". Later revealing that he had already written two chapters of it, before deciding to switch his attention to writing a Once Upon a Time in Hollywood novelization instead.

Once Upon a Time in Hollywood stage adaptation 
In June 2021, Tarantino stated that he had written a stage adaptation of Once Upon a Time in Hollywood, with it featuring material not featured in the original film or the 2021 novelization. Such material includes Rick Dalton's time in Italy, and him and the character Marvin having dinner with Sergio Corbucci and his wife at their favorite Japanese restaurant in Rome. In July 2021, Tarantino believed that it would be his next dramatic work, once he finishes Cinema Speculation. He hopes also that it would debut in the West End theatres of London.

Untitled western novel 
In June 2021, Tarantino stated that he had written two chapters of an original western novel, which he had described as "kind of pulpy".

First Blood film adaptation 
In June 2021, Tarantino revealed that he had an interest in directing a film adaption of the First Blood novel, which had previously been adapted into the 1982 film of the same name. He voiced interest in casting Kurt Russell as the sheriff, and Adam Driver as Rambo. He states that the inspiration for his idea came from the dialogue in the novel, and David O. Russell's career, where Tarantino believed that for his film The Fighter, that he got “over himself, over being the auteur” and focused on making “a good movie,” a strategy Tarantino would seek to emulate. However it was noted unlikely to be produced as Tarantino only intends to direct one more film.

Lancer 
In July 2021, Tarantino opined that Robert Rodriguez could want to direct a Once Upon a Time in Hollywood spin-off movie about fictional actor Rick Dalton's work in the real-world television series Lancer, following up with “I could see that being a great Robert Rodriguez movie.”

The Films of Rick Dalton 

In July 2021, Tarantino revealed that he had written most of a career book, recounting the filmography of the Once Upon a Time in Hollywood character Rick Dalton as if he had actually existed. It would include synopsis, critical quotes from the time, and recounting his film and television career through to 1988. It details every one of Dalton's appearances on episodic television, with most of them being real programs and episodes as opposed to fictional ones (such as Bounty Law).

One such film that would be described would be the fictional vigilant movie The Fireman: 
By December 2021, Tarantino expected the book to be released following Cinema Speculation.

Untitled film novelization 
In July 2021, Tarantino stated, “What I’d like to do, though, at some point, is find a movie that’s not mine and do a novelization,” he said. “It has to be something that I could really go my own way, but not completely upend the apple cart.”

Untitled Cliff Booth project 
When asked about Once Upon a Time in Hollywood character Cliff Booth's time during World War II, Tarantino stated that, "Someday I’ll do his adventure in the POW camp."

Untitled Spaghetti Western comedy project 
In October 2021, Tarantino revealed that he was developing a comedic Spaghetti Western project. He stated that he was "looking forward to shooting" the project, as each actor would speak a different language. The hero was set to be American, a "bad sheriff" was to be played by a German, a Mexican saloon girl was to be played by an Israeli, and a Mexican Bandido was to be played by an Italian.

True Romance novelization 
In December 2021, Tarantino stated that a novelization of the 1993 film True Romance, which he scripted, was a potential future project of his.

See also
Quentin Tarantino
Quentin Tarantino filmography
List of awards and nominations received by Quentin Tarantino

References

External links
 The Lost, Unmade, and Possible Future Films of Quentin Tarantino by IndieWire

unrealized projects
Tarantino, Quentin
Unrealized